(Benjamin) Ifor Evans, Baron Evans of Hungershall (19 August 1899 – 28 August 1982), was a British academic and university administrator. He was Provost of University College London from 1951 to 1966. He spent a year in the Middle East and reported on the state of English and English literature there in 1944. Accordingly, he reached the conclusion that the English Association and the British Council should do more to present English literature to men and women whose first language is not English.

He was knighted by HM The Queen at Buckingham Palace 12 July 1955, and was created a life peer as Baron Evans of Hungershall, in the Borough of Royal Tunbridge Wells, on 25 August 1967.

References

External links

1899 births
1982 deaths
Academics of University College London
Provosts of University College London
Knights Bachelor
Life peers
Life peers created by Elizabeth II